A charm bracelet is a type of bracelet which carries personal jewelled ornaments or "charms", such as decorative pendants or trinkets. The decorative charms usually carry personal or sentimental attachment by the owner.

History
The wearing of charms may have begun as a form of amulet or talisman to ward off evil spirits or bad luck.

During the pre-historic period, jewellery charms would be made from shells, animal-bones and clay. Later charms were made out of gems, rocks, and wood.

For instance, there is evidence from Africa that shells were used for adornments around 75,000 years ago. In Germany intricately carved mammoth tusk charms have been found from around 30,000 years ago. In ancient Egypt charms were used for identification and as symbols of faith and luck. Charms also served to identify an individual to the gods in the afterlife.

During the Roman Empire, Christians would use tiny fish charms hidden in their clothing to identify themselves to other Christians. Jewish scholars of the same period would write tiny passages of Jewish law and put them in amulets round their necks to keep the law close to their heart at all times. Medieval knights wore charms for protection in battle. Charms also were worn in the Dark Ages to denote family origin and religious and political convictions.

Charm bracelets have been the subject of several waves of trends. The first charm bracelets were worn by Assyrians, Babylonians, Persians, and Hittites and began appearing from 600 – 400 BC.

For example, Queen Victoria wore charm bracelets that started a fashion among the European noble classes. She was instrumental to the popularity of charm bracelets, as she “loved to wear and give charm bracelets. When her beloved Prince Albert died, she even made “mourning” charms popular; lockets of hair from the deceased, miniature portraits of the deceased, charm bracelets carved in jet.”

In 1889, Tiffany and Co. introduced their first charm bracelet — a link bracelet with a single heart dangling from it, a bracelet which is an iconic symbol for Tiffany today.

Despite the Great Depression, during the 1920s and 1930s platinum and diamonds were introduced to charm bracelet manufacturing.

Soldiers returning home after World War II brought home trinkets made by craftsmen local to the area where they were fighting to give to loved ones. American teenagers in the 1950s and early 1960s collected charms to record the events in their lives. Screen icons like Elizabeth Taylor and Joan Crawford helped to fuel the interest and popularity of charm bracelets.

Although interest and production waned through the latter part of the 20th century, there was a resurgence of popularity after 2000 and collectors eagerly sought out vintage charms. Inspired by the movie Pirates of the Caribbean, bracelets with little charms of swords, crosses and skulls were introduced as a fashion trend during winter 2006.

Italian charm bracelets

A charm is a small ornament usually dangling from a bracelet or chain. However, the Italian charm bracelet is configured differently. While each charm is separate and interchangeable, it lies flat against the wrist and is interlocking to the next charm, similarly to an expansion band.

See also
 Charivari (decorative chain)
 Momento mori
 Souvenir

References

Bibliography

External links

Bracelets
1970s fashion
2000s fashion